George William Casey Jr. (born July 22, 1948) is a retired four-star general who served as the 36th Chief of Staff of the United States Army from April 10, 2007, to April 10, 2011. He served as Commanding General, Multi-National Force – Iraq from June 2004 to February 8, 2007, and was in the army for his entire adult working life. He now resides in Arlington, Virginia.

Early life and education
Casey was born in Sendai during the Allied occupation of Japan.  His father, George W. Casey Sr., was a West Point graduate who rose to the rank of major general and served in  the Korean War and the Vietnam War. His father commanded the 1st Cavalry Division in Vietnam and was killed on July 7, 1970, when his command helicopter crashed in South Vietnam en route to a hospital to visit wounded American soldiers.

Casey, a military brat, grew up on army posts in the United States, Japan, and Germany and graduated from Boston College High School in Boston, Massachusetts. After high school, he applied to West Point, like his father, but was unsuccessful. He went on to earn a Bachelor of Science degree in international relations from Georgetown University in 1970 and later a Master of Arts degree in international relations from the University of Denver in 1980. Additionally, Casey worked for Vince Lombardi during one summer when the latter was coach of the Washington Redskins.

Career

Casey was commissioned through the Army Reserve Officers' Training Corps in 1970 following graduation from Georgetown University.

Casey served in the Mechanized Infantry during the command portion of his career. He was the commander of the 3rd Brigade of the 1st Cavalry Division, and the Assistant Division Commander – Maneuver (later Assistant Division Commander – Support) of the 1st Armored Division in Germany. He deployed as part of Operation Joint Endeavor to Bosnia-Herzegovina from July 1996 to August 1997. He and the Rear Command Post staff were based in Slavonski Brod, Croatia. Casey took command of the 1st Armored Division in July 1999.

After relinquishing command of the division in July 2001, Casey served in a senior staff position in the Pentagon as the Director of Strategic Plans and Policy (J-5), the Joint Staff from October 2001 to January 2003. His next position was Director of the Joint Staff in Washington, D.C. from January 2003 to October 2003. Following these assignments, Casey was nominated and confirmed as the 30th Vice Chief of Staff of the Army, serving in that post until June 2004.

Multi-National Force – Iraq
Casey served as the senior coalition commander in Iraq from June 2004 to February 2007. He replaced Lieutenant General Ricardo S. Sanchez. Casey's goal was to encourage the Iraqis to take ownership of their problems and responsibility for their own security. For his part as a military commander, he focused on training Iraqi forces, limiting the role of American forces, and transferring the burden for providing security to Iraqi forces. Meanwhile, U.S. diplomats would focus on building and strengthening the Iraqi government and help the Iraqis hold elections. He expressed his view that a large and intrusive American presence in Iraq would not solve the political and security problems in that country and could even fuel the insurgency.

In 2005, Casey was hopeful that the December 2005 Iraqi elections could lead to a more unified and moderate Iraq which—in conjunction with the training of Iraqi security forces—could pave the way for U.S. troop reductions in early 2006. In August 2005, Casey used specific troop numbers in his public discussion of a possible drawdown. He said the troop level of 138,000 could be reduced by 30,000 in the early months of 2006 as Iraqi security forces took on a greater role. President George W. Bush publicly called the talk "speculation" and rebuked the general. The bombing of the al-Askari Mosque, a sacred Shia religious site in Samarra, is believed to have stoked sectarian tensions and derailed coalition plans to speedily transfer significant security responsibility to the Iraqi government by the end of 2006.

In January 2007, Casey implied his opposition to a troop surge:

Army Chief of Staff
In January 2007, President George W. Bush nominated Casey for elevation to Chief of Staff of the Army. Opposition to the nomination came from Senators John McCain and Lindsey Graham who questioned Casey's leadership in Iraq, with McCain's criticisms focused on Casey's "optimistic and rosy scenarios" of progress in the Iraq War. In spite of this, the Senate confirmed his nomination on February 8, 2007, with a bipartisan vote of 83–14.

On February 10, 2007, Casey relinquished command in Iraq to General David Petraeus. Casey officially succeeded General Peter Schoomaker as Chief of Staff of the Army on April 10, 2007.

As the 36th Chief of Staff of the United States Army from April 2007 to 2011, Casey led what is arguably the world's largest and most complex organization—1.1 million people strong, with a $200+ billion annual budget—during one of the most extraordinary periods in military and global political history. He became Chief of Staff of an Army that was stretched from 6 years of continuous war. Over his tenure he stabilized and transformed the army to meet the challenges of the 21st century while continuing to meet the demands of two wars. Casey transformed an army trained and prepared for conventional war, to an agile force more suited to modern challenges.

Casey accelerated the growth of the army, instituted Retention Bonuses for young officers, increased the funding for soldier and family programs, improved the way the army cared for its wounded soldiers and surviving family members and drove down the stigma associated with behavioral health counseling to stabilize an army stretched by war. He also improved the leadership training for the army's General Officer Corps, advanced the transformation of the army's business and decision making processes, moved the army onto a rotational deployment program much like the Marine Corps' and oversaw a substantial improvement in the capabilities of the Army National Guard and Army Reserves.

In the immediate aftermath of the 2009 Fort Hood shooting committed by United States Army psychiatrist Nidal Hasan, Casey expressed concern about jumping to conclusions before the investigation was completed, telling CNN's John King that "this increased speculation could cause a backlash against some of our Muslim soldiers" and "As great a tragedy as this was, it would be a shame if our diversity became a casualty as well." Several months later, in a February 2010 interview, Casey said: "Our diversity not only in our Army, but in our country, is a strength. And as horrific as this tragedy was, if our diversity becomes a casualty, I think that's worse."

Retirement
Casey retired on April 11, 2011. Casey, whose parents were from Massachusetts, moved to Arlington, Virginia upon his retirement. Casey is currently a Distinguished Senior Lecturer of Leadership at Cornell University's Johnson Graduate School of Management as well as a teaching fellow at the University of Virginia's Darden School of Business.

Dates of rank

Awards and decorations

Notes

References

Further reading

External links

Profile at SourceWatch
New Job in Iraq Will Be as Top U.S. Military Leader, June 25, 2004
CNN, Friday, January 5: Gates shakes up command in Iraq, January 5, 2007
Press Briefing by Tony Snow (Jan 5, 2007) concerning change of commanders in Iraq, January 5, 2007
Casey tells Congress Army is stretched too thin, September 27, 2007
Army chief fears backlash for Muslim U.S. soldiers – Adds "And as horrific as this tragedy was, if our diversity becomes a casualty, I think that's worse", November 8, 2009

1948 births
Living people
Joint Chiefs of Staff
Boston College High School alumni
Walsh School of Foreign Service alumni
University of Denver alumni
Josef Korbel School of International Studies people
Commandeurs of the Légion d'honneur
Order of National Security Merit members
Recipients of the Badge of Honour of the Bundeswehr
Grand Cordons of the Order of the Rising Sun
Recipients of the Defense Distinguished Service Medal
Recipients of the Polish Army Medal
Recipients of the Distinguished Service Medal (US Army)
Recipients of the Legion of Merit
Recipients of the Pingat Jasa Gemilang (Tentera)
United States Army personnel of the Iraq War
Military leaders of the Iraq War
United States Army generals
United States Army Chiefs of Staff
United States Army Vice Chiefs of Staff
American expatriates in Germany
American expatriates in Japan